Tropa Mo Ko Unli Spoof (formerly known as Tropa Mo Ko Unli and Tropa Mo Ko Nice di ba?) is a weekly gag show produced by the TV5 Entertainment Group and it is aired every Saturday at 7:00pm (PST) on TV5. Its format similar to Tropang Trumpo which has been aired from 1994 to 1999. The title is a merger between Tropang Trumpo and Lokomoko U, resulting in Ogie Alcasid's return/arrival to TV5.

Launched on September 14, 2013, replacing Lokomoko, Tropa Mo Ko Unli is one of the 8 newly launched weekend programs under the "Weekend Do It Better" block of the network.

The show had its first revamp in June 2014 which resulted to the program's renaming as "Tropa MoKo Nice Diba?!" and the second one that led to the new season as "Tropa MoKo Unli Spoof" in January 2015. The show was ended on July 4, 2015, and it was replaced with  LolaBasyang.com.

Segments

Parodies
Amazing Rice Philippines - parody of TV5's reality competition show Amazing Race Philippines
Anino & Abundat Tonight - parody of the ABS-CBN's primetime talk show Aquino & Abunda Tonight
Balitang Dos Siyete Singko - parody of AksyonTV's former newscast, Balitang 60
Battle of the Brainless - (from Tropang Trumpo)
Beking News - spoof newscast using gay lingo
Binoy Big Brother All In Edition - parody of the ABS-CBN's reality show Pinoy Big Brother: All InChef Boy Lagro: Kusina Monster - parody of GMA-7's cooking show, Chef Boy Logro: Kusina MasterHigh Iskul Bukol Musical - a combined parody of Disney's High School Musical & IBC-13 & TV5's sitcom, Iskul BukolMagandang Gaboom, Beki! - parody of the ABS-CBN's Saturday defunct current affairs program Magandang Gabi... BayanKapag Nasa Katwiran, Ibaklaan Mo! - parody of the ABS-CBN legal drama Ipaglaban Mo!ShoShow A. All the Way - parody of TV5's comedy talk show Jojo A. All The Way!Sarap Diba? - parody of GMA-7's cooking show Sarap DivaThe Laysa Mae Toyo Show - parody of GMA-7's talk show The Ryzza Mae ShowThe Lethal Wife - combined parody of the 2014 ABS-CBN drama The Legal WifeTerry Third Eye - combined parody of Terry Third Thursday and 2012 TV5 horror and suspense series Third EyeMaria Brazo de Mercedes - parody of ABS-CBN telenovela Maria MercedesWalang Relasyon - parody of Radyo5 92.3NewsFM and AksyonTV's program RelasyonOriginal segmentsChaka DiariesPaminta 101 - (starring Vin Abrenica, Ogie Alcasid, Alwyn Uytingco and Edgar Allan Guzman)PatawaRinPoke-PokanGandumb and GandumberWatch Next?Recurring characters
Ryan Secret - Parody of American Idol'' host and AT40 Radio DJ Host Ryan Seacrest, played by Ogie Alcasid
Williard A-Cheng - Parody of ABS-CBN News correspondent Williard Cheng, played by Edgar Allan Guzman
Chef Boy Lagro - Parody of Chef Boy Logro, played by Ogie Alcasid
Laysa Mae Toyo - Parody of Ryzza Mae Dizon, played by Ogie Alcasid
Alvin Elchika - Parody of ABS-CBN Newscaster Alvin Elchico, played by Ogie Alcasid
Anthony Imbiyerna - Parody of ABS-CBN Newscaster & Host Anthony Taberna, played by Alwyn Uytingco
Derek Randy - Parody of TV5 host and actor Derek Ramsay, played by Ogie Alcasid
Kuya Biik - Parody of Roderick "Kuya Dick" Paulate, played by Ogie Alcasid
Amy Bisaya - Combined parody of Amy Perez & Amay Bisaya, played by Gelli de Belen
Ted Fantalon - Parody of ABS-CBN Newscaster Ted Failon, played by Edgar Allan Guzman
Papa Bench - Parody of Bitag host Ben Tulfo, played by Alwyn Uytingco
Loyd De Bora - Parody of TV5 host & reporter Lourd de Veyra
Dyosa Ka Soco - Parody of GMA-7 newscaster Jessica Soho, played by Ritz Azul
Guys Amoygas - Parody of ABS-CBN reporter and host Gus Abelgas, played by Long Mejia
Atty. Gel Kanta Maria - Parody of Radyo5 92.3NewsFM's Relasyon host Dean Mel Sta. Maria, played by Ogie Alcasid
Tootchie Luz-Valdez - Parody of News5 chief Luchi Cruz-Valdez, played by Gelli de Belen
Bruno Dacuycoy - Parody of Bruno Mars, played by Long Mejia with several skits
Doris Bigote - Parody of ABS-CBN News Reporter Doris Bigornia, played by Empoy Marquez
Etching Pulido - Parody of ABS-CBN Showbiz News Reporter Gretchen Fullido, played by Eula Caballero
Vickie Moreorless - Parody of GMA 7 Newscaster & Reporter Vicky Morales, played by Gelli De Belen
Boy Abundo - Parody of ABS-CBN variety talk show Boy Abunda, played by (unknown)

Cast

Main cast members
Alwyn Uytingco

Ogie Alcasid - One of the Original Cast of Tropang Trumpo in ABC5 in 1994. In 1995, he  moved to GMA for Bubble Gang together with Michael V., until he left the show in 2013.
Eula Caballero
Empoy Marquez
Long Mejia
Tuesday Vargas

Extended cast members
Artista Academy top scholars
Vin Abrenica
Sophie Albert
Chanel Morales
Akihiro Blanco
Shaira Mae dela Cruz
Mark Neumann
Alberto Bruno
Benjo Leoncio
Malak So Shdifat
Brent Manzano
Jon Orlando
Nicole Estrada
Stephanie Rowe

Special guests
John Lapus
Kim Idol
Martin Escudero
Bianca King
Bayani Agbayani
Bearwin Meily
Mahal

Former cast
Wendell Ramos - moved to ABS-CBN and then to GMA Network
Edgar Allan Guzman - moved to ABS-CBN and then to GMA Network
Caloy Alde - One of the Original Cast of Tropang Trumpo in ABC5, and Lokomoko U in TV5
Chanel Morales - moved to ABS-CBN
Valeen Montenegro - moved to GMA Network
Dianne Medina - moved to GMA Network
Mark Neumann - moved to ABS-CBN
Joey Paras - moved to GMA Network
Ritz Azul - moved to ABS-CBN
Gelli de Belen - moved to ABS-CBN
Vin Abrenica - moved to ABS-CBN

Awards
Best Comedy/Gag Show - 12th Gawad Tanglaw Awards

See also
TV5
List of programs aired by TV5 (Philippine TV network)
List of Philippine television shows

References

External links
Tropa Mo Ko Unli Website

Philippine television sketch shows
2013 Philippine television series debuts
2015 Philippine television series endings
TV5 (Philippine TV network) original programming
Filipino-language television shows